The Pope and Mussolini: The Secret History of Pius XI and the Rise of Fascism in Europe is a 2014 biography of Pope Pius XI about his relations with Benito Mussolini and rise of Fascism in Europe by David Kertzer. The book examined documentary evidence from the Vatican archives, arguing that Pope Pius XI played a significant role in supporting the rise of fascism and Benito Mussolini in Italy, but not of Nazism in Germany.

The Pope and Mussolini won the 2015 Pulitzer Prize for Biography or Autobiography.

About the book
This is the story of Pope Pius XI’s relations with Italian dictator Benito Mussolini, based on archival material from both.

Reception
The book was lauded by many authors including Joseph J. Ellis, who wrote, "Kertzer has an eye for a story, an ear for the right word, and an instinct for human tragedy. This is a sophisticated blockbuster." The New Yorker called the book "A fascinating and tragic story."The New York Review of Books states, "Revelatory . . . [a] detailed portrait." Historian Paul Gottfried criticized the book for being overly critical of the Church.

Editions
American edition:
 
British edition:
  
Italian edition:
 
German edition:

Awards
The biography won the 2015 Pulitzer Prize in Drama, Letter and Music category of Biography or Autobiography.

 Pulitzer Prize for Biography or Autobiography

References

Further reading

External links
 David Kertzer

2014 non-fiction books
Benito Mussolini
Books about fascism
Books about popes
English-language books
History books about Europe
Holy See–Italy relations
Pope Pius XI
Pulitzer Prize for Biography or Autobiography-winning works
Random House books